Lego City is a theme under which Lego building sets are released based on city life, with the models depicting city and emergency services (such as police and fire), airport, train, construction, and civilian services. Legoland Town is one of the three original themes that Lego produced upon its launch of the Lego minifigure in 1978 along with Castle and Space. The Town brand was briefly replaced with Lego World City in 2003 and 2004 before it was simply rebranded as Lego City in 2005.

Overview
The Lego City theme traces its origins to Lego Town, a theme introduced with the first minifigures in 1978, when a completely new range of buildings and vehicles were introduced for the European markets, although Lego sets with city buildings and vehicles had been commonplace since the late 1960s.

In 1975, a precursor to the minifigure was introduced, in the same scale but without moving parts. Through the mid-1970s Town sets had buildings and vehicles functioning more as models, with minifigures unable to ride the vehicles. This continued with the new minifigures, for some of the sets in its early years. In 1980, the Trains theme was completely revamped to complement the Town sets. By 1983, the remaining vehicle based sets that were not minifigure compatible had been discontinued.

All sets were originally released under the "Legoland" label until it was discontinued and replaced with "Lego System" branding in 1991. Eventually, different subthemes under the "Town" brand were used to tie together related sets, such as police, coast guard, emergency services, airport, road rescue, trains, fire, and harbor. In 1999 Lego Town was replaced by City which was known as Lego City Center in The United States. The theme was discontinued in 2002, and replaced by Lego World City in 2003. During the Christmas season, a City-themed advent calendar set is sold through the online Lego Shop and at retailers.

On June 22, 2019, Lego City Adventures aired on Nickelodeon during a Saturday morning lineup along with SpongeBob SquarePants. From 2020 on, the annual City Advent Calendars would be based on the show specifically, rather than Lego City in general.

In June 2020, following the murder of George Floyd by police, Lego made an announcement that they would temporarily stop marketing police-related Lego City sets. Due to misinformation claiming that they removed these sets from being sold that led to backlash, Lego issued a follow-up statement emphasizing that the sets were still for sale and that digital advertising for the sets would just be temporarily halted.

In January 2021, Lego released a new plate-based road system for the City theme that differed from its predecessor, which used baseplates whose height equaled one-half of plate. However, this system was criticized by some members of the Lego community due to its alleged incompatibility with the former baseplates, which had been gradually reduced in usage and limited to sets such as Lego Modular Buildings, and are less cost-effective.

Sub-themes
According to Bricklink, The Lego Group has released 1392 playsets and promotional packs of the Lego City theme.

Outside of Lego City's generic city and town life based sets that are released regularly (with Fire and Police being the two most prolific - both of which have been the flagship sets throughout the history of the theme), City has had various subthemes, many of which are recurring. Under the Lego Town theme, the subthemes released during the 1990s and early 2000s also had individualized branding and labeling. In 2003 and 2004, the only town-based sets were released under the "World City" label. Since the launch of City in 2005, they are just labeled as City sets but often have multiple sets based around a single concept released at the same time during Lego's release schedule.

Many of these subthemes would diverge notably from the urban city life depicted in general sets, including such themes as leisure resorts, rural farming and space port rocket launching.

In September 2021, Matthew Ashton, The Lego Group's Vice President of Design announced the City alongside Friends, Creator, Classic, Technic, Speed Champions, Monkie Kid, Ninjago, Collectible Minifigures and DOTS themes were continue until at least 2023.

From 1991 to 2002, sub-themes included Arctic, Boats, City Center, Classic, Coastguard, Construction, Drivers, Extreme Team, Fire, Flight, Football, Launch Command, Leisure, Maintenance, Medical, Outback, Paradisa, Police, Race, Racing, Res-Q, Shell, Space Port, Telekom, and Vehicles.

From 2005 to the present, sub-themes have included Airport, Arctic, Cargo, Coast Guard, Construction, Deep Sea Explorers, Farm, Fire, General, Harbour, Jungle, Medical, Mining, Police, Seasonal, Space, Town, Trains, Traffic, Volcano Explorers, and Wildlife Rescue.

Stuntz is a sub-theme and was launched on 1 October 2021. Total of 10 sets being released and featured fly-wheel powered bike functionality through pull back motors. Also included launch ramps, flywheel stunt bikes, obstacles, building Lego flames and dare-devil type challenges.

Octan

Octan is a fictional oil company that has appeared in multiple Lego sets since 1992. 
Before that time, logos of the real-world oil companies Esso, Shell, and Exxon were used on sets. The Shell logo continued to be used on promotional sets after that time. In 2014, Lego announced it would not renew its marketing agreement with Shell, under pressure from the environmental group Greenpeace.

Octan first appeared in the 1992 sets "6397 Gas N' Wash Express" and "6594 Gas Transit". Since the release of the Octan name, Lego has not signed any further deals with Shell or other gas corporations, as Octan was made the primary vehicle fluid company.

Octan (or oktan) is the Danish word for octane, a component of gasoline.

Octan has appeared in a number of Lego video games. Lego Island for example features an Octan gas station and the company sponsors the race track.

In The Lego Movie, Octan is the base company of the main antagonist Lord Business. His company is the producer of almost all of the commodities in his dominion.

In the Lego set "7747 Wind Turbine Transport", a variant of the Octan logo is depicted which reads "Octan Energy", implying a new division responsible for renewable energy. In the set "60016 Tanker Truck", another variant is seen with "Energy" in much larger and fully green type. Set "60257 Service Station" is one of several that feature a third, seemingly finalized design, depicting "OctanE" with orange and blue replacing red and green respectively, as the logo on an EV station, and at least one race car sponsor (Set 60256).

In a number of Town and City sets it is shown that Octan has a racing team that competes in at least Formula One, GT racing and rallying.

Video games

A video game developed by TT Fusion called Lego City Undercover was released for the Wii U on March 18, 2013; a port of the game was released April 4, 2017 on Microsoft Windows, Nintendo Switch, PlayStation 4, and Xbox One. A prequel to the game was also released for the Nintendo 3DS on April 21, 2013. Lego City content, based on Lego City Undercover, was added to the toys-to-life video game Lego Dimensions on May 9, 2017, via a "fun pack" containing a Chase McCain minifigure and a constructible Police Helicopter.

Television series

In 2019, Nickelodeon premiered a new series in June of that year, based on the Lego City theme. The series, titled Lego City Adventures features the newly introduced named characters from the brand as they do their daily jobs in the fictional metropolis.

Theme park attractions
In 2002, a Lego City themed land was introduced to Legoland Deutschland Resort, featuring Airport, Harbour Cruise, Hyundai Legoland Driving School, Hyundai Legoland Junior Driving School, Lego Factory, Legoland Express, Power Builder and Shipyard Playground.

In 2011, a Lego City themed land was introduced to Legoland Florida, featuring Ford Driving School, Ford Jr. Driving School, Flying School, Boating School and Rescue Academy.

In 2012, a Lego City themed land was introduced to Legoland Malaysia Resort. The City area is designed as a miniature town with attractions and rides controlled by children. The area featuring Boating School, Driving School, Junior Driving School, Lego City Airport, Legoland Express, Rescue Academy and The Shipyard.

In 2017, a Lego City themed land was introduced to Legoland Japan Resort. Lego City is on the park's north side, with fun activities for the children and family to do together, like the Junior Driving School where children learn to drive an electric car and receive a driver's license at the end of the ride. Coast Guard HQ allows the driver to take the wheel in a gentle and relaxing boat ride. Besides showing children how to drive, the Rescue Academy offers a fun experience where teamwork is needed to put out fires. The resort also has a Lego cinema where everyone is welcome to watch Lego movies. Lego City has various places to visit such as the Studio Store, Heartlake Shop, and City Shop, each shop with a different theme. There are also three places to buy snacks or lunch, Pit Stop Juice ‘n’ Drive, Brick House Burgers and Marina Snack Shack.

In 2021, a Lego City themed land was introduced to Legoland New York a land that is made to look like a city and based on the Lego City toy theme. The area featuring Coast Guard Academy, Driving School, Fire Academy and Junior Driving School.

Lego City 4D - Officer in Pursuit was released in Legoland California Resort on 12 April 2019 and then rolled out to other Legoland Parks and Legoland Discovery Centres in 2019. It is currently located in all Legoland parks and Legoland Discovery Centres and is available at scheduled times alongside other short films, including The Lego Movie: 4D – A New Adventure and Lego Ninjago: Master of the 4th Dimension.

In November 2021, Lego City themed land was announced for the upcoming launch of Legoland Shanghai Resort in 2024.

Reception
In September 2016, The Lego Group reported that the Lego City, Lego Star Wars, Lego Ninjago and Lego Nexo Knights themes had delivered a turnover of DKK 15,692 million in the first half of 2016, a sales increase of 10 per cent compared with the same period in the previous year.

In March 2022, The Lego Group reported that the Lego City, Lego Technic, Lego Creator Expert, Lego Harry Potter and Lego Star Wars themes had earned for the full year of 2021. Revenue for the year grew 27 percent versus 2020 to DKK 55.3 billion and consumer sales grew 22 percent over the same period, outpacing the toy industry and driving market share growth globally and in largest markets.

On 28 September 2022, The Lego Group reported that the Lego Star Wars, Lego Technic, Lego Icons (formerly Creator Expert), Lego City, Lego Harry Potter and Lego Friends themes had earned for the six months ending 30 June 2022. Revenue for the period grew 17 percent to DKK 27.0 billion compared with the same period in 2021, driven by strong demand. Consumer sales grew 13 percent, significantly ahead of the toy industry, contributing to global market share growth.

In January 2023, Farmers Market (set number: 60345) was listed as one of "The Best Lego Sets for Kids in 2023" by IGN.

In March 2023, The Lego Group reported that the Lego City, Lego Technic, Lego Icons, Lego Harry Potter and Lego Star Wars themes had earned for the full year of 2022. Revenue for the year grew 17 percent to DKK 64.6 billion and consumer sales grew 12 percent in 2022, achieving growth in all major market groups with especially strong performance in the Americas and Western Europe.

Awards and nominations
In 2008, Lego City was awarded "Toy of the Year" and also "Activity Toy of the Year" by the Toy Association.

In 2009, Garage (set number: 7642) was awarded "DreamToys" in the Construction category by the Toy Retailers Association.

In 2010, Airport (set number: 3182) and Cargo Truck (set number: 3221) were awarded "DreamToys" in the Creative Play category by the Toy Retailers Association.

In 2011, Harbour (set number: 4645), Police Boat (set number: 7287) and Police Station (set number: 7498) were awarded "DreamToys" in the Construction category by the Toy Retailers Association.

In 2012, Mine (set number: 4204) was awarded "DreamToys" in the Construction category by the Toy Retailers Association.

In 2013, Coast Guard (set number: 60014) was awarded "DreamToys" in the Granny Knows Best category by the Toy Retailers Association.

In 2014, Mobile Police Unit (set number: 60044) was awarded "DreamToys" in the Build The World category by the Toy Retailers Association.

In 2015, Deep Sea Exploration Vessel (set number: 60095) was awarded "DreamToys" in the Build It And They Will Thrive category by the Toy Retailers Association.

In 2016, Volcano Exploration Base (set number: 60124) was awarded "DreamToys" in the Action Station category by the Toy Retailers Association.

In 2017, Coast Guard 4x4 Response Unit (set number: 60165) and Jungle Exploration Site (set number: 60161) were awarded "DreamToys" in the Build It, Make It, Do It category by the Toy Retailers Association.

In 2018, Arctic Mobile Exploration Base (set number: 60195) was awarded "DreamToys" in the Play, Set & Match category by the Toy Retailers Association.

In 2019, Deep Space Rocket and Launch Control (set number: 60228) was awarded "DreamToys" in the Trains, Planes and Automobiles category by the Toy Retailers Association.

In 2020, Deep Space Rocket and Launch Control (set number: 60228) was awarded "Toy of the Year" and also "Construction Toy of the Year" by the Toy Association.

In 2021, Stunt Show Truck (set number: 60294) was awarded "DreamToys" in the Everybody's Building category by the Toy Retailers Association.

See also
 Lego City 4D - Officer in Pursuit
 Lego Castle
 Lego Pirates
 Lego Space
 Lego Trains

References

Bibliography 
 Lego City: Calling All Cars! (Level 1). Authored by Sonia Sander. Published by Scholastic US, 2010. 
 Lego City: Emergency Rescue Activity Book with Lego Minifigure. Published by Penguin Random House Children's UK, 2011. 
 Lego City: Fight this Fire (8x8). Authored by Anthony Michael Steele and Chuck Primeau. Published by Scholastic US, 2011. 
 Lego City: Spot the Crook: A Search and Find Book. Published by Penguin Books Ltd., 2011. 
 Lego CITY: Space Mission Activity Book with Minifigure. Published by Penguin Books Ltd., 2011. 
 Lego City Brickmaster. Published by Penguin Books Ltd, 2011. 
 Lego CITY: Police on Alert! Storybook with Minifigures and Accessories. Published by Penguin Random House Children's UK, 2012. 
 Lego CITY: Fire Team Adventure! Storybook with Minifigures and Accessories. Published by Penguin Random House Children's UK, 2012. 
 Lego City: Merry Christmas Lego City. Published by Scholastic US, 2012. 
 Lego City Sticker Storybook: Escape from Lego City. Authored by Wade Wallace. Published by Scholastic US, 2012. 
 Lego City: Save This Christmas. Authored by Rebecca McCarthy and J Jason May. Published by Scholastic US, 2012. 
 Lego City Space Escape!. Authored by Rafat Kotsut. Published by Scholastic, 2013. 
 Lego City: Detective Chase McCain: Stop That Heist! Level 2 Reader. Authored by Trey King and Kenny Kiernan. Published by Scholastic US, 2013. 
 Lego City: Fix That Truck (8x8). Authored by Anthony Michael Steele. Published by Scholastic US, 2013. 
 Lego City: Where's the Pizza Boy?. Published by Scholastic Inc., 2013. 
 Lego City: Build and Find with Minifigure. Published by Penguin Random House Children's UK, 2014. 
 Lego City: Mystery on the Lego Express. Authored by Trey King and Sean Wang. Published by Scholastic US, 2014. 
 Save That Cargo. Authored by Trey King and Chuck Primeau. Published by Scholastic US, 2014. 
 Lego City: Adventures in Lego City (Reader Boxed Set). Published by Scholastic US, 2015. 
 Lego City: 3, 2, 1 Liftoff!. Authored by Sonia Sander. Published by Scholastic US, 2016. 
 Lego City: Build This City!. Published by Scholastic US, 2016. 
 Lego City: Catch That Crook!. Authored by Michael Anthony Steele. Published by Scholastic US, 2016. 
 Jungle Chase! (Lego City). Authored by Ace Landers and Paul Lee. Published by Scholastic US, 2017.

External links

 Official sites: United States  , United Kingdom 

 
City
Products introduced in 1978

sv:Lego#Lego City